Radek Procházka (born 6 January 1978 in Prostějov) is a Czech former professional ice hockey player.

Procházka played in the Czech Extraliga for HC Olomouc, HC Karlovy Vary, HC Femax Havířov, HC Keramika Plzeň, VHK Vsetín, HC Vítkovice, HC Znojemští Orli and HC Kometa Brno.

References

External links 
 
 

1978 births
Living people
HC Berounští Medvědi players
Czech ice hockey centres
HC Havířov players
JKH GKS Jastrzębie players
HC Karlovy Vary players
HC Kometa Brno players
HC Olomouc players
Orli Znojmo players
Sportspeople from Prostějov
HC Plzeň players
HC ZUBR Přerov players
LHK Jestřábi Prostějov players
Hokej Šumperk 2003 players
TH Unia Oświęcim players
HC Vítkovice players
VHK Vsetín players
Czech expatriate ice hockey people
Expatriate ice hockey players in Poland
Czech expatriate sportspeople in Poland